Alexandria Library is the public library in Alexandria, Virginia in the United States.

History
In 1794, Alexandria Library opened as a private lending library, calling itself the Alexandria Library Company.

In 1937, Dr. Robert South Barrett donated funds to build a public library in memory of his mother, physician Dr. Kate Waller Barrett (1857-1925). The Society of Friends granted a 99-year lease for use of its former Quaker Burial Ground (then used as a playground). An informal agreement provided that the interments would not be disturbed, although the few gravestones were transferred to the Woodlawn Quaker Meetinghouse and a granite marker acknowledges the former use. Thus, the new library building was built without a basement, but rather on a concrete slab foundation (as were subsequent additions). The Library Company cooperated in this effort, contracting with the Alexandria City Council to turn over its collections to City of Alexandria as the City agreed to include the public library's operating expenses in its budget.

Due to practices common in Virginia and other Southern states at the time, the public library originally only permitted white residents to use the facility. On August 21, 1939, several young African American men, in a strategy devised by attorney Samuel Wilbert Tucker (who grew up about two blocks from the new library), staged a peaceable sit-in at the library to enable African Americans to use that public facility in the first known non-violent sit-in of the Civil rights movement in America. Although they were arrested, charges were ultimately dropped by city attorney Armistead Boothe, and a branch library was built in 1940 for African Americans and named after Robert H. Robinson, which closed circa 1960 and now houses the Alexandria Black History Museum.

Current operations
Today the library consists of a new central building (built in 2000 and named for mayor Charles E. Beatley) and four branch libraries, and includes two special divisions: Local History /Special Collections (in what became the Kate Waller Barret Branch Library) and a Talking Books division for the blind and visually handicapped. The other library buildings are: the Ellen Coolidge Burke Branch Library, the James M. Duncan Branch Library and the law library branch located in the historic Alexandria City Hall near the Barrett branch.

Patrons check out more than 1.5 million titles annually, including books, CDs, DVDs, magazines, and other items. The system owned 503,191 items and had 700,921 library visitors (more than 1.3 million including its web site) in FY2017. The library's current director is Rose T. Dawson.
Among its more than 150 employees are more than 40 staff with master's degrees in library science.

The library offers a wide variety of programs and services, both in the branches and via the Web site. Each branch has computers for access to the Internet, the catalog, downloadable material and databases. Library sponsored programs include: summer reading, One Book/One City, literary discussion groups, author book signings, children story times and other events for the city's diverse population. The Alexandria Library also started offering passport services at the Barrett Branch and Beatley Central Library in October 2016.

Non-resident privileges 
Non-Residents of the city who work, own property or attend school in the city may obtain a library card without charge. Non-Residents that live in an area that will offer reciprocal library card privileges to Alexandria residents may also obtain a free library card. Thus residents of the District of Columbia, the Maryland Counties of Montgomery, and Prince George's, the Virginia cities of Fairfax and Falls Church, and Virginia counties of Arlington, Fairfax, Fauquier, Frederick, Loudoun, and Prince William are all eligible.

Nearby public library systems
 Arlington Public Library
 Fairfax County Public Library
 District of Columbia Public Library
 Prince George's County Memorial Library System

References

Buildings and structures in Alexandria, Virginia
Tourist attractions in Alexandria, Virginia
Education in Alexandria, Virginia
Public libraries in Virginia
1794 establishments in Virginia